Arman Yeremyan (born 29 January 1986) is an Armenian taekwondo athlete. He is an Armenian and European Champion. Yeremyan has been awarded the Master of Sport of Armenia, International Class title.

Biography
Arman Yeremyan was born on 29 January 1986 in Yerevan, Armenian SSR. He took up taekwondo under Arsen Avetisyan. He participated in and became the winner of junior international competitions. He won silver and bronze medals at the European Youth Championships in 2001 and 2003. Yeremyan won three bronze medals at the Universiade in 2005, 2007 and 2009. Yeremyan's most significant success was his gold medal victory at the 2008 European Taekwondo Championships in Rome, Italy in the men's welterweight (78 kg) division. He made history as the first Armenian taekwondoist to become a European Champion.

Yeremyan was the flag bearer for Armenia at the 2012 Summer Olympics and is the fifth Olympian to bear the flag of Armenia at the Summer Olympics. Albert Azaryan was originally intended to bear the Armenian flag at the 2012 Olympics, but the decision was changed due to his age and the honor was passed onto Yeremyan instead.

Yeremyan won a gold medal at the 2012 European Taekwondo Olympic Qualification Tournament in Kazan, Russia, qualifying him to compete at the 2012 Olympic Games in London. At the tournament, he defeated eventual 2012 Olympic silver medalist Nicolás García and Tommy Mollet. Yeremyan also became the first taekwondo practitioner from Armenia to compete at the Olympics.

In the first round of the 2012 Summer Olympics in the men's welterweight (80 kg) division, Yeremyan beat Canadian Sébastien Michaud, avenging an earlier loss to Michaud. Yeremyan defeated Dutchman Tommy Mollet once again in the quarterfinals. In the semifinals, Yeremyan narrowly lost by one point to Sebastián Crismanich of Argentina. Yeremyan previously defeated Crismanich in an earlier match. Crismanich went on to become the Olympic Champion. Yeremyan next lost the bronze medal match because of controversial scoring to Lutalo Muhammad of the host nation Great Britain in a fight where many of Yeremyan kicks weren't counted and many of Muhammad's shouldn't have been. Yeremyan, who scored a head kick in the final seconds that went uncounted, stood confused after the match was over. He came in fifth place.

He won a silver medal at the 2016 European Taekwondo Championships in Montreux, Switzerland in the men's middleweight (87 kg) division.

References

External links
 
 

1986 births
Living people
Sportspeople from Yerevan
Armenian male taekwondo practitioners
Olympic taekwondo practitioners of Armenia
Taekwondo practitioners at the 2012 Summer Olympics
Taekwondo practitioners at the 2015 European Games
European Games competitors for Armenia
Universiade medalists in taekwondo
Universiade bronze medalists for Armenia
European Taekwondo Championships medalists
Medalists at the 2005 Summer Universiade
Medalists at the 2007 Summer Universiade
Medalists at the 2009 Summer Universiade